Alan Carter (born September 13, 1959) is an American television director, producer, editor, and screenwriter. In the 1980s and 1990s, Carter worked as a music video editor. His big client was Phil Collins. He began working on television when he edited a David Copperfield Magic Special for CBS in 1993, winning his first of two Emmys.

Filmography

Director

2011-2015 The Voice (TV Series) (154 episodes)

2015 The 21st Annual Screen Actors Guild Awards (TV Special)
 
2015 The 41st Annual People's Choice Awards (TV Movie)
 
2011-2014 Shark Tank (TV Series) (50 episodes)

The Biggest Loser (TV Series) (5 episodes, 2009 - 2011) (director - 1 episode, 2013)

2012 The 38th Annual People's Choice Awards (TV Special)
 
2010-2011 Minute to Win It (TV Series) (60 episodes)

2011 The 37th Annual People's Choice Awards (TV Special)

2010 The 2010 Miss Universe Pageant (TV Special)

2010 The 36th Annual People's Choice Awards (TV Special)

2009 The Newlywed Game (TV Series) (1 episode)

2009 2009 CMT Music Awards (TV Movie)

2008 Macy's Passport Celebrity Catwalk Challenge (TV Special)

2008 Heroes: Countdown to the Premiere (TV Movie documentary)

2008 2008 ALMA Awards (TV Movie)

2008 Last Comic Standing (TV Series) (1 episode)

2008 2008 CMT Music Awards (TV Special)

2008 Your Mama Don't Dance (TV Series)

2008 Dance War: Bruno vs. Carrie Ann (TV Series) (6 episodes)

2007 Clash of the Choirs (TV Mini-Series)

2007 Phenomenon (TV Series) (5 episodes)

2007 2007 Taurus World Stunt Awards (TV Special)

2007 2007 CMT Music Awards (TV Special)

2007 The 2007 Miss America Pageant (TV Movie)

2006 Great Performances (TV Series) (2 episodes)

2006 VH1 Big in 06 Awards (TV Movie)
 
2006 CMT Giants-Reba (TV Series) (1 episode)

2006 Fuse Fangoria Chainsaw Awards (TV Special)

2006 The One: Making a Music Star (TV Series)

2006 The CMT Music Awards 2006 (TV Special)

2006 12th Annual Screen Actors Guild Awards (TV Special)

2006 The 11th Annual Critics' Choice Awards (TV Movie documentary)

2006 Moving Image Salutes Ron Howard (TV Movie)

2006 Gretchen Wilson: Undressed (TV Movie)

2005 Brad Paisley's Muddi Gras (TV Movie)

2005 But Can They Sing? (TV Series)

2005 Dancing with the Stars (Dance Off) (TV Movie)

2005 My Kind of Town (TV Series)

2005 Miss Universe 2005 (TV Special)

2005 Nick & Jessica's Tour of Duty (TV Movie)

2005 The CMT Music Awards (TV Special)

2005 11th Annual Screen Actors Guild Awards (TV Special)

Paris By Night 88, 90, 92 to 106, 108, 111, 120, 123, 129 (Vietnamese musical variety show)

External links

1959 births
Living people
People from Waco, Texas
American television directors
Writers from Texas